Lawn Hill is an unincorporated community in Hardin County, in the U.S. state of Iowa.

History
Lawn Hill was platted in 1880. The community contained a post office from 1881 until 1943. Lawn Hill's population was 25 in 1902, 22 in 1915, and 61 in 1925.

References

Unincorporated communities in Hardin County, Iowa
Unincorporated communities in Iowa
1880 establishments in Iowa